Luke Jager (born January 17, 2000) is an American cross-country skier. He competed in the sprint and skied the first leg of the Men’s 4 × 10 km relay at the 2022 Winter Olympics. He attended West Anchorage High School in Anchorage, Alaska. Luke skis collegiately for the University of Utah and is studying Economics in the class of 2023.

Cross-country skiing results
All results are sourced from the International Ski Federation (FIS).

Olympic Games

Distance reduced to 30 km due to weather conditions.

World Cup

Season standings

References

External links

2000 births
Living people
American male cross-country skiers
Cross-country skiers at the 2022 Winter Olympics
Olympic cross-country skiers of the United States
People from Redding, California